The 1905–06 Scottish Division One season was won by Celtic by six points over nearest rival Hearts.

League table

Results

References

1905–06 Scottish Football League
Scottish Division One seasons
Scottish